Nord's 24th constituency was a French legislative constituency in the Nord département. It was abolished in the 2010 redistricting of French legislative constituencies.

References 

Defunct French legislative constituencies
French legislative constituencies of Nord
Constituencies established in 1958